New Hopewell may refer to:
Hopewell, Cleburne County, Alabama
New Hopewell, Tennessee
 New Hopewell, a landmark farm in Jefferson County, West Virginia